Four Barrel Coffee is a coffee roaster based in San Francisco, California, with two cafes in San Francisco. Like competitors Ritual Coffee Roasters and Blue Bottle, Four Barrel is among local, independent companies which roast their own beans, wholesale, and operate cafes. Unique among local coffeeshops, Four Barrel does not provide free Wi-Fi or power for laptops. Four Barrel opened in 2008 and was started by one of the founders of Ritual,  with its first location in the Mission District. In April 2017, Benny Gold collaborated with Four Barrel Coffee to offer, limited edition commemorative product.

In January 2018 eight former employees filed suit against Four Barrel and its founder Jeremy Tooker, alleging that he sexually assaulted multiple women and created a toxic workplace culture for non male employees. The company settled the lawsuit out of court and Tooker left the company and divested his shares in it. The remaining owners were reportedly planning to rebuild the company with a 100% employee owned model. Multiple companies have ceased to carry Four Barrel product in the wake of the suit. As of seven months later the company has not made a transition to being worker owned and "will not for the foreseeable future," according to co-owners Tal Mor and Jodi Geren. They cite a lack of profitability and have pledged to begin profit sharing with employees by the end of the year, should the business stabilize.

References

External links

 Official website
 Four Barrel Coffee on sfwiki.org

Coffeehouses and cafés in the United States
Food and drink companies based in San Francisco
Drink companies based in California
Food and drink companies established in 2008
American companies established in 2008
2008 establishments in California